The discography of Versailles, a Japanese visual kei metal band formed in 2007 by vocalist Kamijo and guitarist Hizaki. After recruiting bassist Jasmine You, drummer Yuki and guitarist Teru, they performed their first show on June 23. Their key characteristics are their Rococo-esque costumes, dueling guitars and heavy but melodic arrangements. Versailles gained a significant worldwide following soon after forming as their debut EP Lyrical Sympathy (2007), released by Kamijo's own label Sherow Artist Society, received a simultaneous European release and they performed in Europe and the United States the following year. Their first full-length album, Noble released in 2008, was also released in North America in 2009.

Versailles signed to major label Warner Music Japan in mid-2009, however, on August 9, days after announcing he would be suspending activities for health reasons, Jasmine You died. Their major debut album Jubilee (2010) was completed with Hizaki performing the unfinished bass tracks. They went on a world tour that took them to Latin America and Europe and ended with new bassist Masashi officially joining. 2011 began with the whole band starring in their own television show titled , that ran from January to March. Their third album Holy Grail (2011) was their highest charting, reaching number 12 on the Oricon, and was supported by their second world tour. On July 20, 2012, Versailles announced they would be stopping all activities at the end of the year. They released their last album, the self-titled Versailles, on September 26 and after a short tour, performed their last concert at NHK Hall on December 20.  The band has reunited for a concert on December 28, 2015 at Zepp DiverCity in Tokyo and has planned another one in 2016 also. In February 2017, the band played a concert at the historical venue Nippon Budokan.

Albums

Studio albums

Extended plays

Live albums

Compilation albums

Singles
{| class="wikitable"
|- bgcolor="#F4ECA5"
!width="60" rowspan=3 | Year
!width="280" rowspan="3"| Single
!width="200" colspan=2| Peak chart position
!rowspan=3 width="200" colspan="1"|Album
|-style="font-size:smaller;"
!bgcolor="#F4ECA5" colspan="2" |Oricon StyleSingles Weekly Chart
|- style="font-size:smaller;"
!bgcolor="#F4ECA5" width="50"|Indie
!bgcolor="#F4ECA5" width="50"|Normal
|-
|-align="center"
|align="center" rowspan=1  bgcolor="#F4ECA5"|2007
|align="left" bgcolor=F7F1B9|"The Revenant Choir"
|align="center" bgcolor="FBF8D6" rowspan=2 colspan=2|—
|align="center" rowspan=2 bgcolor="FBF8D6"|Noble|-align="center"
|align="center" rowspan=2  bgcolor="#F4ECA5"|2008
|align="left" align="left" bgcolor=F7F1B9|"A Noble Was Born In Chaos"
|-align="center"
|align="left" bgcolor=F7F1B9|"Prince & Princess"
|align="center" bgcolor="FBF8D6"|1
|align="center" bgcolor="FBF8D6"|16
|align="center" rowspan=2 bgcolor="FBF8D6"|Jubilee|-align="center"
|align="center" rowspan=1  bgcolor="#F4ECA5"|2009
|align="left" bgcolor=F7F1B9|"Ascendead Master"
|align="center" bgcolor="FBF8D6" rowspan=5|—
|align="center" bgcolor="FBF8D6"|8
|-align="center"
|align="center" rowspan=1  bgcolor="#F4ECA5"|2010
|align="left" bgcolor=F7F1B9|"Destiny -The Lovers-"
|align="center" bgcolor="FBF8D6"|17
|align="center" rowspan=2 bgcolor="FBF8D6"|Holy Grail|-align="center"
|align="center" rowspan=1  bgcolor="#F4ECA5"|2011
|align="left" bgcolor=F7F1B9|"Philia"
|align="center" bgcolor="FBF8D6"|15 
|-align="center"
|align="center" rowspan=2  bgcolor="#F4ECA5"|2012
|align="left" bgcolor=F7F1B9|"Rhapsody of the Darkness"
|align="center" bgcolor="FBF8D6"|—
|align="center" rowspan=2 bgcolor="FBF8D6"|Versailles|-align="center"
|align="left" bgcolor=F7F1B9|"Rose"
|align="center" bgcolor="FBF8D6"|23
|-align="center"
|-
!colspan="5" |Promotional songs
|-
|-style="font-size:smaller;"
|-align="center"
|align="center" rowspan=1  bgcolor="#F4ECA5"|2008
|align="left" bgcolor=F7F1B9|"Prince"
|align="center" bgcolor="FBF8D6" colspan=2|—
|align="center" bgcolor="FBF8D6"|Noble|}

Various artists compilations

Music videos

DVDs
 The Revenant Choir (June 23, 2007)
 Aesthetic Violence (December 12, 2007) – given with bottle of each member's perfume, Oricon DVDs Ranking: #219 (Yuki's version)
 Urakizoku (裏貴族, December 24, 2007) – Node of Scherzo; features Versailles, Kaya and Juka
 Kakumei no Anthology (革命のアンソロジー, May 18, 2009) – promotional clip DVD given out at the band's Kakumei no Anthology events
 History of the Other Side (May 20, 2009) #48
 Chateau de Versailles (May 20, 2009) #42
 Onegai Kanaete Versailles (おねがいかなえてヴェルサイユ "Fulfill My Wish Versailles", July 6, 2011) – all 10 episodes of their TV drama, #84
 Chateau de Versailles -Jubilee- (December 21, 2011) #103 (world edition)
 Chateau de Versailles -Holy Grail- (October 31, 2012) #36
 Live Best (March 27, 2013) #232
 Chateau de Versailles -Final-'' (April 10, 2013) #65

References

Discography
Discographies of Japanese artists
Heavy metal group discographies